YURIA (born October 10, 1967) is a musician and voice actress from Osaka Prefecture, Japan.

She was the lead vocalist and guitarist for Honey Bee, currently she is the lead vocalist and bassist for the Japanese punk rock band Pinky Doodle Poodle. She is also the voice actress for Ama Shigure in the anime Shuffle! and its associated eroge video game.

Discography

YURIA

Singles 
 WISH (released November 22, 2002)
 WISH — anime television series Choujuushin Gravion ending theme
 KISS ME — anime television series Choujuushin Gravion insert song

 YOU (released August 3, 2005)
 YOU — anime television series Shuffle! opening theme
 colorful

 ORIGINAL! (released November 23, 2005)
 ORIGINAL! — PS2 game Shuffle! On The Stage opening theme
 mermaid blue

 Remember Memories (released November 22, 2006)
 Remember Memories — PC game Really? Really! opening theme
 Happy Go Lucky Days

Album 
 YURIA (released February 22, 2006)
 Dream & Love
 Dakishimete (Honey Bee) — PC game ENSEMBLE ~maichiru hane no ensemble~ opening theme
 Kimi ni Futatabi Aeta Kiseki — PC game Boy Meets Girl opening theme
 Aozora — anime television series Green Green ending theme
 LA♪LA♪BYE (Honey Bee) — anime television series Choujuushin Gravion Zwei ending theme
 Daiji Da.i.ji — anime television series Mahoraba Heartful Days opening theme
 Nukegake Shinai de — anime television series Onegai Twins image song
 Mirage Lullaby — PC game Shuffle! opening theme (2004)
 You make my day! — PC game Otome wa Boku ni Koishiteru opening theme
 WISH
 YOU - anime television series Shuffle! Opening thème
 Monochrome (Studio Live Ver.) — PC game Green Green Midori ending theme
 baby kiss

 YURIA2 (released November 21, 2007)
 never say goodbye — PC game Tick! Tack! ending theme
 LAST SUMMER — PC game Natsumegu insert song
 Look at me — anime television series School Days ending theme
 Fateful Encounters — anime television series Shuffle! Memories opening theme
 Koe ga Kikoeru — PC game Reconquista insert song
 AROUND THE WORLD — PC game Edelweiss ending theme
 Remember Memories — PC game Really? Really! opening theme
 Natsumegu — PC game Natsumegu opening theme
 Natsu no Melody — PC game Natsumelo opening theme
 ORIGINAL! — PS2 game SHUFFLE! On The Stage opening theme
 Shouten no Niji — PS2 game Katakamuna ~ushinawareta ingatsu~ theme song
 NO ROCK NO LIFE (Honey Bee) — anime television series Sumomo mo Momo mo ~Chijou Saikyou no Yome~ first ending theme
 120-en no Haru — PS2 game 120-en no Haru theme song
 Shampoo shiteageru

Honey Bee

Singles 
 LA♪LA♪BYE (released February 25, 2004)
 LA♪LA♪BYE — anime television series Choujuushin Gravion Zwei ending theme
 soul★mate

 Plastic Smile (Nijiiro Guitar VERSION) (released October 28, 2005)
 Plastic Smile (Nijiiro Guitar VERSION) — anime television series Canvas 2 ~Niji Iro no Sketch~ opening theme
 BLUE SKY — PS2 game Canvas 2 ~Niji Iro no Sketch~ opening theme

 NO ROCK NO LIFE (released November 22, 2006)
 NO ROCK NO LIFE — anime television series Sumomo mo Momo mo ~Chijou Saikyou no Yome~ first ending theme
 Guitar Satsujin Jiken

Album 
 Honey Bee 1 (released July 26, 2006)
 Sepia Color no Meiro o Nukete — PC/PS2 game Tamakyuu opening theme
 Plastic Smile (Nijiiro Guitar VERSION) — Canvas2 PC/Anime opening theme
 Dakishimete — PC game ENSEMBLE ~maichiru hane no ensemble~ opening theme
 Cherry Jam — PC/PS2 game Cherrish Pizza wa Ikaga desu ka♥ opening theme
 soul★mate
 BANG-SO-CO — PC/PS2 game Tamakyuu ending theme
 BLUE SKY — Canvas2 PS2 version opening theme
 Colorful Candy — PC game Natsukoi ending theme
 RIDE ON
 Eien no Kizuna — PC game Tenkuu no Sinfonia ending theme
 LA♪LA♪BYE
 Mune Kyun Sapuri — PC game Tenkuu no Sinfonia 2 opening theme
 forever
 SUMMER RAINBOW — PC game Natsukoi opening theme

Doutonbori Divers 
 2004-08-15: Ajiwatte Mitai
 2005-03-25: DO-born
 2006-09-30: Ouch!

Sweets Tankentai 
 2005-11-25: NA NA IRO — anime television series Canvas 2 ~Nijiiro no Sketch~ ending theme

Pinky Doodle Poodle 
 2014-04-22: Pinky Doodle Poodle — full-length album 
 2015-10-16: Inside is Out — full-length album

References

External links 
 
 YURIA'S blog
 Yuria's interview on MATA-WEB (in French)
 Yuria's interview on Kochipan (in French)

Japanese women pop singers
Japanese women rock singers
Japanese voice actresses
Living people
Musicians from Osaka Prefecture
Anime musicians
1979 births
21st-century Japanese singers
21st-century Japanese women singers